Espadon was a Narval-class submarine of the French Navy. Along with sister boat Marsouin, the boat was the first French submarine to steam under sea ice. The boat is currently a museum ship.

Career 
Espadon was commissioned in 1960.

In 1961, as she served as a target for mock torpedo exercises, Espadon was hit by two inert torpedoes, damaging her propeller. She nevertheless managed to surface, but had to be towed to Toulon.

In September of the same year, while cruising underwater, Espadon collided with the submarine Laubie, sustaining extensive damage to her bow and to the front of her sail.

On 13 August 1963 a fire in the torpedo room wounded and intoxicated four sailors, one of whom later died of his wounds.

In May 1964, Espadon and Marsouin steamed under sea ice in the Norwegian Sea as far as 70° north.

Espadon undertook significant modifications from 1966 to 1968, notably upgrading the boat's sonar, sail and rudders.

Espadon has been a museum ship at the "ville-port" of Saint-Nazaire in the German-built submarine base since 1987.

See also

List of submarines of France

Sources and references 

 Sous-marin d'escadre Espadon, netmarine.net 

French Narval-class submarines
Ships built in France
1958 ships
Cold War submarines of France
Museum ships in France